Horace Merle Cochran (1892 – 1973) was an American diplomat, economist, and career Foreign Service Officer. He served as the first U.S. Ambassador to Indonesia from 1949 to 1953.

Early life and education 
Cochran was born in 1892 in Crawfordsville, Indiana. He earned a Bachelor of Science and Master of Science from the University of Arizona.

Career 
After joining the United States Foreign Service, Cochran served as Vice Consul in Germany, Mexico, Guatemala, Switzerland, Jamaica, Haiti, and Montreal, Canada. He then served as Deputy Liaison Officer at the United States Department of State in Washington, D.C. He served as Consul in Paris and Switzerland before returning to France to serve as Financial Secretary of the Embassy. Cochran briefly left the State Department to serve as the Technical Assistant to the United States Secretary of the Treasury from 1939 to 1941 under Henry Morgenthau Jr. From 1941 to 1948, Cochran served as a Senior Foreign Service Inspector. He was nominated to serve as U.S. Ambassador to Pakistan in 1949, but was never confirmed. He served as the first U.S. Ambassador to Indonesia from 1949 to 1953. He was commissioned during a recess of the United States Senate and recommissioned on February 2, 1950, after confirmation. 

Cochran retired from the Foreign Service in 1953, and worked as Deputy Managing Director of the International Monetary Fund from 1953 to 1962. From 1963 to 1969, he served as the Chairman of the Greek consortium of the OECD.

Death 
Chochran died on September 20, 1973, in Houston, Texas at the age of 81.

References

1892 births
1973 deaths
People from Crawfordsville, Indiana
University of Arizona alumni
Ambassadors of the United States to Indonesia
Truman administration personnel
United States Foreign Service personnel
International Monetary Fund people